

ls-lt
LSD
LTA II Kit

lu

lub-lut
lubazodone (USAN)
lubeluzole (INN)
lubiprostone (USAN)
lucanthone (INN)
lucartamide (INN)
lucatumumab (USAN)
lucimycin (INN)
lucinactant (USAN)
Ludiomil
lufenuron (INN)
lufironil (INN)
lufuradom (INN)
Lufyllin
luliconazole (USAN)
lumefantrine (INN)
Lumenhance
Lumigan
lumiliximab (INN)
lumiracoxib (USAN)
lunacalcipol (INN)
Lunelle
Lungaggregate Reagent
lupitidine (INN)
Lupron
luprostiol (INN)
lurasidone hydrochloride (USAN)
lurosetron (INN)
lurtotecan (INN)
lusupultide (USAN)
lutrelin (INN)
Lutrepulse Kit
lutropin alfa (INN)

luv-lux
Luvox (Jazz Pharmaceuticals)
luxabendazole (INN)
Luxiq (Stiefel Laboratories)

ly
Lygen
lymecycline (INN)
Lymphazurin (Tyco Healthcare)
LymphoScan (Immunomedics, Inc.)
LymphoStat-B (GlaxoSmithKline)
lynestrenol (INN)
Lynoral
Lyophilized Cytoxan
lypressin (INN)
Lyrica (Pfizer)
lysergic acid diethylamide
lysergide (INN)
Lysodren (Bristol-Myers Squibb)